The Red Bull RB15 is a Formula One racing car designed and constructed by Red Bull Racing to compete during the 2019 FIA Formula One World Championship. The car was driven  by Max Verstappen, Pierre Gasly and Alexander Albon. Pierre Gasly was originally meant to be driving the car for the entire season after moving from Toro Rosso to replace Daniel Ricciardo. However, after the 2019 Hungarian Grand Prix it was announced that Alexander Albon would be replacing Gasly for the remainder of the season. The RB15 is the first car built by Red Bull Racing with a Honda engine, and made its competitive début at the 2019 Australian Grand Prix. Max Verstappen's win at the 2019 Austrian Grand Prix made the RB15 the first Honda-powered car to achieve victory since Jenson Button won for Honda at the 2006 Hungarian Grand Prix in the Honda RA106.

Development

Competition history

Later use 
A modified RB15 was used during testing of the 2022 tyre compounds after the 2021 Abu Dhabi Grand Prix.

Lap records 
The car holds the following official and outright lap records :

Complete Formula One results
(key)

 Driver failed to finish the race, but was classified as they had completed over 90% of the winner's race distance.

References

External links
Red Bull Racing Official Website

Red Bull Formula One cars
2019 Formula One season cars